Curtitoma decussata is a species of sea snail, a marine gastropod mollusk in the family Mangeliidae.

Description
The length of the shell varies between 5 mm and 13 mm.

The shell has an ovate-fusiform shape, with a moderate, scarcely turreted spire. It contains six or seven round-shouldered whorls. The sculpture consists of about 24 sigmoid longitudinal ribs, evanescing about the middle of the body whorl, and close revolving striae across the ribs. The sinus is well marked, close to the suture. The siphonal canal is narrowed, but short. The columella is nearly straight in the middle. The color of the shell is white, yellowish or pinkish white.

Distribution
This marine species is circum-arctic and occurs in the Northwest Atlantic Ocean, Canada and the Gulf of Maine; on the continental shelf of the Alaskan Beaufort Sea; found at depths between 25 m and 780 m. It has also been found as a fossil in Quaternary strata of Greenland and Iceland; age range: 2.588 to 0.781 Ma.

References

 Couthouy, J. P. (1839) Monograph on the family Osteodesmacea of Deshayes, with remarks on two species of Patelloidea and descriptions of new species of marine shells, a species of Anculotus and one of Eolis. Boston Journal of Natural History, 2 (2) : 129–189.
 Brunel, P.; Bosse, L.; Lamarche, G. (1998). Catalogue of the marine invertebrates of the estuary and Gulf of St. Lawrence. Canadian Special Publication of Fisheries and Aquatic Sciences, 126. 405 p
 A. J. W. Hendy, D. P. Buick, K. V. Bulinski, C. A. Ferguson, and A. I. Miller. 2008. Unpublished census data from Atlantic coastal plain and circum-Caribbean Neogene assemblages and taxonomic opinions.

External links
  Tucker, J.K. 2004 Catalog of recent and fossil turrids (Mollusca: Gastropoda). Zootaxa 682:1-1295.
 Trott, Thomas J. "Cobscook Bay inventory: A historical checklist of marine invertebrates spanning 162 years." Northeastern Naturalist 11.sp2 (2004): 261-324
 
 Gulbin, Vladimir V. "Review of the Shell-bearing Gastropods in the Russian Waters of the East Sea (Sea of Japan). III. Caenogastropoda: Neogastropoda." The Korean Journal of Malacology 25.1 (2009): 51-70

decussata
Gastropods described in 1839